Once Bitten may refer to:

Music
 Once Bitten (Annabel Lamb album) (1983)
 Once Bitten (The Snakes album) (1998)
 Once Bitten (Great White album)
 "Once Bitten, Twice Shy", an Ian Hunter song from the 1975 album Ian Hunter, later covered by Great White
 "Once bitten twice shy", a Vesta Williams song from the 1986 debut album Vesta

Film and TV
 Once Bitten (1932 film), a 1932 British comedy film starring Richard Cooper
 Once Bitten (1985 film), a 1985 American horror comedy film starring Jim Carrey
 Once Bitten Soundtrack, the soundtrack released to go along with the 1985 film Once Bitten
 "Once Bitten" (SpongeBob SquarePants episode), a 2006 episode of the cartoon series SpongeBob SquarePants
 "Once Bitten" (Archer episode), a 2013 episode of the cartoon series Archer
 Once Bitten (Family Guy), an episode of Family Guy

Literature
 Once Bitten, Twice Shy, a novel in the Jaz Parks series by Jennifer Rardin.

Theatre
 Once Bitten, English title of Le Procès Veauradieux, an 1875 farce by Alfred Hennequin and Alfred Delacour